Ganjar Pranowo (born 28 October 1968) is the Governor of Central Java who has served since 23 August 2013.  He is a member of the Indonesian Democratic Party of Struggle. Previously, he was a member of the People's Representative Council of the PDI-P faction for the 2004–2009 and 2009–2013 periods. In addition, Ganjar also served as General Chairperson of KAGAMA (Alumni Family of Gadjah Mada University) for the 2014–2019 period.

On 19 October 2022, he expressed his possible run for 2024 Indonesian Presidential Election. He has also been described as populist-left.

Early life 

Ganjar Pranowo, born Ganjar Sungkowo, was born to a family in a village on the slopes of Mount Lawu, Karanganyar, to a father named S Parmudji Pramudi Wiryo (1930–2017) and a mother named Sri Suparni (1940–2015). He is the fifth of six children. His brothers are Pri Kuntadi, Pri Pambudi Teguh, Joko Prasetyo, Prasetyowati, and Nur Hidayati. Pranowo's father was a police officer and was assigned to take part in the crackdown of PRRI/Permesta.

Ganjar changed his name, a common tradition for children in ancient Java-Mataraman land. His original name Ganjar Sungkowo means "Rewards of Troubles / Sorrow (Sungkowo)." However, when he entered school, Sungkowo's name was changed to Pranowo because his parents feared that the child would "always wallow in misfortune and trouble" if his name remained as Sungkowo.

Education

Early education 

Because of his father's work his family moved to Kutoarjo. His junior high school is SMPN 1 Kutoarjo. Furthermore, he attended . In high school, he was active in scouting activities (Dewan Ambalan).

Towards the end of high school graduation in the late 1980s, his father retired from his service in the National Police. To meet the family's economic needs, Ganjar's mother opened a grocery shop, while she sold gasoline on the roadside.

University 

After graduating from high school, he continued his studies at the Faculty of Law, Gadjah Mada University (UGM). On-campus, he joined the Indonesian National Student Movement (GMNI) known as Gerakan Mahasiswa Nasional Indonesia. During his time at university, Ganjar was active in the Indonesian National Student Movement known as Gerakan Mahasiswa Nasional Indonesia(GMNI).

While studying at UGM, Ganjar admitted that he had taken two semesters off due to not having the money for lectures. He graduated from the UGM school of law in 1994 with thesis examiner professor, Prof. Nindyo Pramono. Ganjar claimed to have a 'hobby of demonstrations' during college. He has protested against the rector of UGM at that time 

Ganjar also earned his master's degree from Universitas Indonesia's Faculty of Social and Political Sciences, graduating from the Political Science Masters program.

Early career 

After graduating, Pranowo would relocate to Jakarta to pursue work. He found employment in the oil and gas sector, working for PT Prakarsa Pramandita as a human resource development consultant officer. In addition, he also worked for PT Prastawana Karya Samitra and PT Semeru Realindo Inti.

Active in GMNI and admiring Sukarno, Ganjar initially became a PDI sympathizer. Pranowo would join the Indonesian Democratic Party (PDI). With the support of party leaders, Pranowo would declare himself a PDI cadre in 1996. That year was vital for PDI and Pranowo, PDI was hit by an internal conflict between supporters of Suryadi and Megawati Soekarnoputri as representatives of the Bung Karno (Sukarno) ideology, leading to the creation of a new party, the Indonesian Democratic Party of Struggle (PDI-P). Pranowo supported Megawati, eventually leading him to choose a career in politics through the PDI-P Party led by Megawati Sukarnoputri. Ganjar also supported Megawati whose father is a police officer, and her brother a judge, by the New Order regime is prohibited from politics and must fully support Golkar.

Ganjar was a witness to the 27 July 1996 incident when the New Order regime led by Suharto ordered a mob of police officers and soldiers in civilian garb to attack the PDI headquarter, due to PDI allegedly inspiring protests in favor of PDI candidate Megawati Sukarnoputri who was leading a movement against Suharto's undemocratic crackdown on election freedom, leading Pranowo to choose a career in politics through the PDI-P Party led by Megawati.

People's Representative Council

Tenure

First term 

After receiving advice from fellow party members such as Pramono Anung, Bima Arya, and Hasto Kristianto he decided to run for a People's Representative Council (Dewan Perwakilan Rakyat, DPR) seat in 2004.

He represented the constituency of Central Java 7 (same constituency as Pranowo), also known as Purbalingga.

During his first term as a member of the DPR from 2004 to 2009, Pranowo was assigned to Fourth Commission of the People's Representative Council which oversees the agriculture, environmental affairs, forestry, and maritime affairs. He specifically worked closely with other legislators to take care of the forestry department across the country. In addition, he has been placed on the Special Committee for the Political Party Bill as chairman of a special committee, a member of the Legislative Body of the DPR, and Chairman of the Special Committee on the MPR, DPR, DPD and DPRD in the DPR.

Second term 

Also, Ganjar was allowed to lead legislative council members. He was also elected as the chairman of the Special Committee dealing with the MD3 Bill. Due to his expertise in the industry, the management of the PDIP assigned him to sit on Second Commission. This department dealt with supervising home affairs, local autonomy, public service, bureaucratic reform, elections, land affairs, and agrarian reform.

He became known to the public because he was a member of the Special Committee for Inquiry Rights for Century Bank as well as Deputy Chairman of Commission II of the DPR.

Amid his political life, he had completed his postgraduate studies at the Faculty of Social and Political Sciences, at the University of Indonesia in 2013. He was a postgraduate student at FISIP UI beginning in 2009, but was forced to take leave due to his busy schedule as a member of the DPR.

Governor of Central Java

Elections

2013 

While working in the DPR, Ganjar gained popularity as a leader due to his significant impact on running state affairs. This experience led to his decision to run for Governor of Central Java in 2013, his running mate was Heru Sudtmoko. Central Java holds 7% of Indonesia's population. The campaign slogan for the Pranowo-Heru campaign was "mboten korupsi, mboten ngapusi" (no corruption, no lying).

The pair would win the election with 48.82% of the vote. Ganjar's inauguration as governor was held on Friday, 23 August 2013, by the Minister of Home Affairs Gamawan Fauzi.

Winning the election gave him a chance to lead the region as a governor between the years 2013 and 2018. Since Ganjar had served in the legislature for more than nine years, he had acquired enough governing experience and the leadership skills required to transform Central Java. He diverted his efforts in elevating community programs, repairing infrastructure programs, introducing free education, capitalizing on coffee farming, and many more.

2018 

Pranowo ran for re-election in 2018, and was paired with  who is a member of the Central Java Regional People's Representative Council from 2014 to 2019. His running mate for the campaign was Taj Yasin Maimoen, a member of the Central Java DPRD for the 2014–2019 period from the PPP faction and represented the 3 Central Java Electoral Districts (Pati, Rembang, Grobogan, and Blora Regencies). Pranowo was re-elected in a lower than expected 58.78 percent of the vote with 10,362,694 votes, notably losing the Brebes, Tegal, Purbalingga, and Kebumen regencies, which had previously been PDI-P strongholds.

Leadership

Illegal levies at the Subah Weighbridge 

On 27 April 2014, Ganjar caught the public's attention when he expressed his anger at Department of Transportation officers who practiced illegal levies (extortion) during a surprise inspection at the Subah weighbridge in Batang Regency. Ganjar admitted that he saw first-hand several clerks who gave money from Rp. 10,000 to Rp. 20,000 or below the official highest fine of Rp. 60,000 to officers.

The finding of illegal levies in Subah resulted in a policy that closed the weighbridges in Central Java since May 2014. However, this policy later caused Central Java to lose revenue of Rp. 10.118 billion as recorded by the Supreme Audit Agency (BPK) on Central Java's financial statements for 2014. Alwin Basri, one of the leaders of the local DPRD Commission, said that the policy caused losses for the province itself.

The weighbridge closure was not followed by an official evaluation and study of the duties and functions of employees on duty at each weighbridge. Alwin alleged that the governor's visit to the weighbridge was just to bolster his image, while creating a loss of Rp 10.118 in revenue for the province. The weighbridge has since been reopened.

Indonesian Cement dispute case 

In 2017, by casting their feet on cement blocks, farmers from Kendeng staged a demonstration in front of Istana Negara in Jakarta to sue the new environmental permit for PT Semen Indonesia which was signed by the Governor of Central Java, Ganjar Pranowo.

Ganjar is considered to not be as involved in the dispute between PT Semen Indonesia and the residents of Rembang. Since 2015, residents have tried to resist the construction of a cement factory in the Kendeng mountains by taking legal action and holding demonstrations ranging from the erection of tents at the project site, a 150 km long march to Semarang, to the symbolic action of cementing feet in front of the State Palace, Jakarta.

Kendeng residents' lawsuit to cancel the cement factory permit was granted after the Supreme Court (MA) on 2 August 2016, issued a Judicial Review (PK) decision which canceled the Decree (SK) regarding the Environmental Permit for Mining Activities by PT Semen Gresik in Rembang Regency.

Although the PK's decision has prohibited mining and drilling in groundwater basins in the Kendeng mountain area, Ganjar on 9 November 2016, issued an "addendum" or a new decree by changing the name of PT Semen Gersik Tbk to PT Semen Indonesia Tbk. According to him, the court's decision has not yet explained whether the factory will continue or not, so the establishment of the Semen Indonesia factory will continue because there is no order to close it.

Responding to a demonstration by residents who demanded that the factory shut down after the Supreme Court granted the residents' claim, Ganjar stated that his administration was willing to stop the Semen Indonesia factory in Rembang as long as the policy was approved by the central government. However, President Joko Widodo said resolving the factory issue was the responsibility of the provincial government and the central government had no authority to issue permits for cement factories owned by government companies.

The Indonesian Forum for the Environment (Walhi), one of the environmental permit claimants in a written release, claimed Ganjar was "toying with the law in the interests of the industry." Walhi Executive Director Nur Hayati said Ganjar had carried out a tactic to evade the obligation to obey the law and court decisions when residents obeyed and respected the law. According to him, "The governor issued a policy that poses a high risk to the people and the environment by ignoring the voice of the people, especially the farmers who have been defending their land, water, and sources of life with their souls and lives."

On 19 December 2016, hundreds of Kendeng residents demonstrated demanding the closure of the cement factory in Rembang because they were disappointed with Ganjar's read of the legal situation. The merit of the demonstrations came under question as the list of residents' names contained the names of Ultraman and Power Rangers.

Along with widespread pressure from residents for the governor to cancel the environmental permit for factory construction, according to the Supreme Court's decision, Gus Nuril Arifin, the leader of the Abdurrahman Wahid Soko Tunggal Islamic Boarding School, who once met with demonstrators at the project site, said Ganjar should not be ashamed of the company that built the factory. "Given the power to destroy nature, this doesn't keep the promise. This policy is hypocritical and should not be continued," Arifin said regarding the situation about Pranowo.

On 17 January 2017, Ganjar issued a decree canceling his previous addendum. He decided to postpone the process of establishing the Semen Indonesia factory in Rembang until a permit decree was issued in adjustment to the PK MA decision. However, a new permit "with a slight change of territory" was re-issued on 23 February 2017, considered a bad precedent for law enforcement in Indonesia, the Semarang Legal Aid Institute (LBH) condemned the issuance of the new permit. Director of LBH Semarang, Zainal Arifin called the new environmental permit illegal and "a form of governor's arrogance."

Policy 
During his leadership, Ganjar enacted financing loan reform from Bank Jateng for MSMEs with the KUR Mitra 25 product bearing an interest of 7 percent per year, while Mitra 02 was at 2 percent, without collateral, and without administrative fees. When launched, the loan interest was the lowest in Indonesia; now the model is replicated by other local governments throughout the country and has even received attention and appreciation from President Joko Widodo.

In 2015, the Corruption Eradication Commission awarded the Provincial Government of Central Java, led by Pranowo, an award for its consistent reports of corruption and gratification. The recognition came due to Ganjar's dedication in controlling the giving of gratuities to both governors and officials of the Central Java provincial government. Now, the Eid parcel culture doesn't even exist anymore in the Central Java Provincial Government.

Ganjar made a breakthrough by requiring all state civil servants (ASN) which numbered more than 40,000 in the Central Java Provincial Government to pay zakat (based on PP No. 14 of 2014, Presidential Instruction No. 3 of 2014, and the appeal of the Governor of Central Java Ganjar Pranowo). The income of each ASN is directly deducted by 2.5 percent. Monthly, IDR 1.6 billion is collected which is used for disaster assistance, repair of uninhabitable houses (RTLH), education and Islamic boarding schools, mosques, health sector, and others.

In 2016, Ganjar launched a program to form disaster-resilient villages. The target is that by 2018 all of the 2204 disaster-prone villages in Central Java become disaster resilient. Pranowo helped form 100 independent villages, mostly in areas that have the potential to become tourist destinations and deliver natural resources for community development.

In the health sector, Ganjar has planned the construction of an international standard modern hospital at MAJT (Central Java Grand Mosque). In addition, Ganjar Pranowo also launched the "Jateng Gayeng Nginceng Wong Meteng" program he initiated early during his administration.

Pranowo also brought about farmer cards during his administration. These cards contain data on the identity of the farmer, the area of land, the type of plant, and the need for fertilizer. Outside of farmers, no one has access to subsidized fertilizers, thereby eliminating crime and abuse of authority. President Jokowi then appreciated and made the farmer card a national program.

Twitter use 
Before and when he was governor of Central Java, Pranowo was known to use the social media application Twitter to communicate with the public. During the inauguration of the acting regional head, he asked officials to be active on social media so that they could quickly receive complaints from residents and respond to and find out the latest information from their respective regions. According to Pranowo, through social media, he can listen to input, criticism, and even hear protests from people who do not like his policies in leading Central Java.

Work as Governor 

Ganjar focused on eliminating corruption cases within the region, creating fair opportunities for all the residents within the constituency. The region got an opportunity to flourish under the leadership of Ganjar, who was dedicated to transforming every aspect of life. Pranowo helped elevate economic levels for the well-being of his people. During the coronavirus pandemic, Ganjar Pranowo was at the forefront of helping his people fight the virus in all possible ways.

Pranowo led to the introduction of various activities within the country, including virtual education that gave his people a competitive opportunity on the market. The Central Java region has greatly transformed under the leadership of Pranowo and the country in general. Pranowo is said to continue serving his people until the year 2023 when his second term as Governor ends.

COVID-19 pandemic 
In the midst of the coronavirus pandemic in Indonesia, Pranowo said he would prepare a heroes cemetery for medical personnel who died due to the coronavirus. The statement was in response to the case of residents' rejection of the funeral of a nurse at the Dr. Kariadi Hospital in Semarang who died from the virus. The statement drew criticism; some felt he should have paid more attention to the availability of Personal Protective Equipment (PPE) to protect medical personnel; rather than speaking about graves. For this criticism, Ganjar said those who were using the situation to criticize were doing so for political gain.

2024 presidential election speculation 

Ahead of the 2024 Presidential election, which will occur in February 2024, Pranowo has been the subject of media speculation on whether or not he will run for the presidency. In a poll conducted by New Indonesia Research & Consulting, Pranowo polls with 20.5%, with defense minister and 2019 presidential candidate Prabowo Subianto coming in second with 16.7%.

This has resulted in rising tensions with Puan Maharani and the chairman of the PDI-P Election Winning Body (Bappilu) . Culminating in 2021, when Pranowo was not invited to an important PDIP event in Central Java.

On 19 October 2022, he expressed his possible run for 2024 Indonesian Presidential Election. His unofficial supporters speculated that Megawati Soekarnoputri already given her consent and approval for him to run for presidency instead of Puan.

Controversy

Bank Indonesia funding flow case 
During his first term in the DPR, Pranowo attracted media coverage because his name was included in a copy of a document that revealed the flow of Bank Indonesia funds to Senayan legislators in April 2008. Ganjar (then a member of the DPR) was mentioned by name in the documents as Ganjar Prastowo. Ganjar confirmed that the Ganjar Prastowo was himself. He later said that he was invited abroad by Bank Indonesia, adding that if the visit is deemed unlawful, Ganjar is ready to return the money he received. BI also acknowledged the authenticity of the document.

Pranowo allegedly accepted the funding from Bank Indonesia to pass bills regarding banking industry. Pranowo stated that he didn't understand the source of the funding, and if the funding he had received is breaking the law he stated that he will return the money. According to anti-corruption non-governmental organizations, Pranowo, along with other fellow DPR members, Bomer Pasaribu (Golkar), Ali Masykur Musa (National Awakening Party), and Andi Rahmat (Prosperous Justice Party), received the funding for their travel to London. Pranowo stated that he is invited to London as a guest, and he didn't know the source of the funding, or the intention of the funding for his travel to London.

He was never charged of any wrongdoing in the situation.

E-KTP corruption scandal 
Muhammad Nazaruddin as the former General Treasurer of the Democratic Party became a witness at the follow-up trial of the e-KTP corruption case . In his testimony, he was questioned about the disbursement of funds to Pranowo. To the judge, Nazaruddin believes that Pranowo, who is now the governor of Central Java, received the money in the project to procure an electronic-based Identity Card (E-KTP). He even admitted that he saw the money handed over to Pranowo, who was then Deputy Chairman of Commission II of the DPR. "Everything I have said is true, Your Honor," said Nazaruddin to the panel of judges. Pranowo denied that he knew about the distribution of money, but Pranowo stated that Mustokoweni has offered money to him as a "deposit". Pranowo said that he rejected the offer of money, and he has no knowledge that it is related to the E-KTP corruption scandal.

Several members of Commission II DPR RI 2009–2014 received money in the electronic ID card project according to the minutes allegedly belonging to Miryam S Haryani, found during the investigation. Miryam is a politician from the Hanura Party, a member of Commission II of the DPR RI for that period. In the case of the electronic ID card handled by the Corruption Eradication Commission, Miryam is still a witness and is allegedly the coordinator of the scheme.

In the police report on 1 December 2016, the Chairman of Commission II of the DPR RI Chairman Harahap (at that time) assigned Miryam to coordinate the distribution of US$300,000 (two stages) from Sugiharto to members of Commission II of the DPR. Sugiharto is the official commitment maker for the electronic ID card project at the Directorate General of Population and Civil Registration at the Ministry of Home Affairs. From the first phase of US$100,000, each member of Commission II representative received Rp. 30 million ($3,000 US dollars), each kapoksi per person is Rp. 75 million ($7,000 US dollars), and each leader Rp. 100 million ($10,000 US dollars).

In the leaked and investigation police report, Miryam admitted that he was asked to hand it over to four leaders of Commission II of the DPR RI, each Rp. 100 million. They are Burhanudin Napitupulu from the Golkar Party Ganjar Pranowo from the PDI-P, Taufiq Effendi from the Democratic Party, and Teguh Juwarno from the National Mandate Party (PAN). Ganjar stated that he refused the money from Miryam and returned it to her. Out of the four leaders of the Commission II of the DPR RI, only Ganjar refused the money. Ganjar stated that he is happy when the report is leaked as the report showed that he didn't receive any money.

Pranowo has always denied the accusations regarding his involvement in the 2011–2012 fiscal year case and he stated that he is always ready to be confronted on this matter. When questioned in December 2016, Pranowo stated that he is only questioned as a witness.

In 2017, during the indictment of Setya Novanto, one of the perpetrators of the corruption, the name of Ganjar is not mentioned in the case.

In 2018, KPK announced that they haven't found any evidence that Ganjar received any money related to the E-KTP case.

In 2019, Pranowo was questioned again about the case but he stated that he did not have any information to share with the public.

In 2022, Pranowo is reported again to the KPK for the e-KTP corruption case. Secretary-General Hasto Kristiyanto of PDIP later said "This is a political dynamic ahead of the 2024 presidential election." He believes the investigation is an attempt to hurt Pranowo if he runs for president in 2024, and that the corruption is not related to Ganjar.

Pornography controversy 

In an interview with Deddy Corbuzier, Pranowo explained that he once accidentally shared a porn video to his Twitter account. When one of his follower asked him why he is watching the video, Pranowo said, "Eh, if I watch porn where is the fault, I really like it. I am an adult and have a wife." He continued, "Sometimes as an adult it is necessary," while stating that watching porn is mature and healthy. "It's ugly, I'm talking about the ITE Law (Electronic Information and Transactions Law)," he continued during the interview.

He elaborated sharing porn videos violates the Electronic Information and Transactions Law (UU ITE), not viewing them. In relation to the statement, Ganjar recalled his experience giving a laptop to a student who admitted watching pornography during his visit to a school. Ganjar praised the student for his honesty and described him as having a leadership potential. "I said, if there is no teacher, that is wrong sex education," Pranowo told the student, warning him that pornography shouldn't be used as a guide in his own sex life.

After the video of the interview went viral, Pranowo requested that those who commented about his statement should watch the full video instead. He clarified that he was not a fan of porn videos and that the diction of several news pieces that reported him as a "porn addict" were outright wrong.

Pranowo's statement in the interview was criticized by various parties. Sinar Suprabana, a Central Javan academic, argued that Pranowo's statements in the interview was unethical and it "would be better for him to shut up and take steps to improve himself" instead of "giving clarification". Muslim cleric  stated that Pranowo couldn't be a politician since he already watches porn.

Personal life 
Pranowo is married to Siti Atikah Supriyanti, the daughter of Akhmad Musodik Supriyadi and Astuti Supriyadi. Akhmad is a Nahdlatul Ulama leader from Purbalingga, Central Java, and was the son of Kyai Hisyam Abdul Karim, founder of the Roudlotus Sholihin Islamic Boarding School in Sokawera Hamlet, Kalijaran Village, Karanganyar. They met in 1994 and got married in 1999 and have one son together, Muhammad Zinedine Alam Ganjar (b. 2001), and has graduated SMAN 3 Semarang, Central Java in 2020 and is now a student of Universitas Gadjah Mada.

References 

1968 births
Governors of Central Java
Indonesian Muslims
Living people
People from Karanganyar Regency
Members of the People's Representative Council, 2004
Members of the People's Representative Council, 2009
University of Indonesia alumni
Gadjah Mada University alumni
Indonesian Democratic Party of Struggle politicians